Osmow's Shawarma is a Canadian chain of quick-service shawarma restaurants. It currently has over a hundred locations in North America, servicing British Columbia, Alberta, Ontario, Quebec, and Florida.

History  

Osmow's Shawarma was founded in 2001 in Streetsville, Ontario. Egyptian immigrant Sam Osmow took over a sub shop in 1999 after arriving in Canada, but it was not very successful after two years in operation. One day, when Osmow was eating shawarma for lunch, a customer asked what it was and tried it. The customer liked it and suggested that Osmow add it to the menu. Osmow then rebranded the restaurant to Osmow's and started selling shawarma instead. It was not very successful at first as customers were not used to the food, but after handing out samples at the Streetsville Bread and Honey Festival, popularity grew.

Products 

Osmow's offers several different shawarma options, including plates, platters, and wraps. Different meats are offered, including chicken, beef, lamb, and vegetarian falafel. Plates are served with meat on either "rocks" (rice), "stix" (french fries), or on vegetables. Platters are the same as plates but also include a salad. Wraps are served in a wrap with vegetables and meat. There are also shawarma poutines available.

Operations 

Osmow's operates a commissary system. The company buys all of its ingredients in bulk and processes them at a central processing plant in Mississauga, Ontario. It then sends them all to the stores on a daily basis. The company marinates, slices, and packages all ingredients in the plant.

Expansion 

In 2015, Osmow's only had about 13 locations. However, the company then started to franchise aggressively and currently has over 100+ locations.

Osmow's expansion strategy differs from other chains. Instead of requiring franchisee candidates to have restaurant experience with a solid resume, the company judges a potential franchisee based on how they would run the store and its approach. The company judges based on how a candidate would deal with customer inquiries and complaints, or how they would deal with an underperforming location. The franchisee is then sent for training at the corporate store in downtown Toronto.

In 2022, Osmow's opened its first American location in Miami, Florida.

Marketing 

In 2019, Osmow's launched ads featuring NBA Toronto Raptors players Fred VanVleet and Norm Powell. They were the smallest company to ever do an NBA Finals commercial. The ads surpassed the company's marketing budget but resulted in sales increases of over 30–40% at its downtown location. These ads were considered to be the most effective ads in comparison to other Raptors ads, according to a study.

Osmow's Shawarma registered 15 October as National Shawarma Day. On this day, Osmow's offers shawarma for the original price of $5. The first National Shawarma Day in 2020 resulted in very long lineups at stores.

In June 2022, Osmow's announced that it would become an official partner for Canada Soccer for the upcoming 2022 FIFA World Cup in Qatar.

References

Restaurant chains in Canada
Companies based in Mississauga
2001 establishments in Ontario